János Kriesch (29 March 183421 October 1888) was a Hungarian hydro-biologist, zoologist, agronomist, corresponding member of the Hungarian Academy of Sciences. He served as Director-General of Budapest Zoo & Botanical Garden for a short time in 1868.

His zoological work has primarily focused on the inspection of fishes, furthermore he was among the first Hungarian representatives of Social Darwinism. One of his pupils was Lajos Méhelÿ. His son was Aladár Körösfői-Kriesch, a famous painter and artist.

References

External links
 Firbás, Nándor: Kriesch János (1834–1888). Vasárnapi Újság, 1888. No. 44. p. 723–724.
 Szinnyei, József: Magyar írók élete és munkái VII. (Köberich–Loysch). Budapest: Hornyánszky. 1900.
 Magyar életrajzi lexikon I. (A–K). Chief editor: Ágnes Kenyeres. Budapest: Akadémiai. 1967. p. 1018.
 Magyar agrártörténeti életrajzok II. (I–P). ed. Lajos Für, János Pintér. Budapest: Magyar Mezőgazdasági Múzeum. 1988. p. 300–301. 
 Új magyar életrajzi lexikon III. (H–K). Chief editor: László Markó. Budapest: Magyar Könyvklub. 2002. p. 1219. 
 A Magyar Tudományos Akadémia tagjai 1825–2002 II. (I–P). Chief editor: Ferenc Glatz. Budapest: MTA Társadalomkutató Központ. 2003. 748–749. o.
 
 

1834 births
1888 deaths
Hungarian zoologists
Hungarian biologists
Members of the Hungarian Academy of Sciences